The Green Globe certification is an assessment of the sustainability performance of travel and tourism businesses and their suppliers. Businesses can monitor improvements and document achievements leading to certification of their sustainable operation and management.

The standard includes 44 core criteria supported by over 380 compliance indicators. The applicable indicators vary by type of certification, geographical area, and local factors. The entire standard is reviewed and updated twice each year.

The standard, available to all Green Globe members, covers the following areas of sustainability:

 Management
 Social and Economic
 Cultural Heritage
 Environment

Each section includes a complete set of indicators, certification policies and procedures, and auditor guidelines.

Harmonization, accreditation 

Green Globe is active in harmonizing with other established sustainability certification programs worldwide. Such harmonization contributes to maintaining core criteria, and addresses regional issues through the adoption of locally developed standards.

The standard is based on these international standards and agreements:

 Global Sustainable Tourism Criteria
 Global Partnership for Sustainable Tourism Criteria (STC Partnership)
 Baseline Criteria of the Sustainable Tourism Certification Network of the Americas
 Agenda 21 and principles for Sustainable Development endorsed by 182 Governments at the United Nations Rio de Janeiro Earth Summit in 1992
  ISO 9001 / 14001 / 19011 (International Standard Organization)

A third-party independent auditor is appointed to work on-site. The international ISO 19011 standard guides the management of audit programs, the conduct of internal and external management systems, and the competence and evaluation of auditors.

External links 

 Green Globe Website

Sustainable tourism
Environmental standards